The Croatian Military Frontier ( or ) was a district of the Military Frontier, a territory in the Habsburg monarchy, first during the period of the Austrian Empire and then during Austria-Hungary.

History
Founded in the late 16th century out of lands of the Habsburg Kingdom of Croatia, it was initially a nominal part of that Kingdom, to be transferred in 1627 to direct imperial rule as part of the Military Frontier. The Frontier was located on the border with the Ottoman Empire. In the Frontier zone, the king-emperors promised free land and freedom of religion to people who came to the area with the majority of the population being Croats, Serbs and Vlachs. In exchange, the people who lived in the area had an obligation to militarily fight for the Empire, and to protect the land. In 1630 Emperor Ferdinand II enacted the Statuta Valachorum laws. It was known that the soldiers had to fulfill military service from the age of 16 until 66. In the end of the 17th century, Habsburg Kingdom of Croatia expanded its borders so territory of Croatian Military Frontier was also expanded to include some former Ottoman territories in the east. In 1783 it was placed under the unified control of the Croatian General Command headquartered in Zagreb. The Military Frontier was demilitarized on 8 August 1873. Croatian Military Frontier existed until 15 July 1881, when it was abolished and incorporated into the Kingdom of Croatia-Slavonia (like the Slavonian one).

Geography

This part of the Military Frontier included the geographic regions of Lika, Kordun, Banovina and bordered the Adriatic Sea to the west, Venetian Republic to the south, Habsburg Kingdom of Croatia to the north-west, the Ottoman Empire to the south-east, Habsburg Kingdom of Slavonia to the east, and Habsburg Kingdom of Hungary to the north.

It extended onto the Slavonian Military Frontier near the confluence of the Una river into the Sava. Like the rest of the Military Frontier, it ceased to exist as a political entity in the late 19th century.

Sections

Croatian Military Frontier included three General Command sections which were divided into eight Regiments:
 Varaždin General Command
 Križevci Regiment N°V
 Đurđevac Regiment N°VI
 Karlovac General Command
 Lika Regiment N°I
 Otočac Regiment N°II
 Ogulin Regiment N°III
 Slunj Regiment N°IV
 Zagreb General Command
 Glina Regiment N°X
 Petrinja Regiment N°XI

Demographics
In 1802, the estimated population consisted of:
 195,300 Roman Catholics
 180,800 Orthodox Christians

In 1820, estimated population of Croatian Military Frontier included:
 207,747 Catholics
 198,728 Orthodox Christians

According to Hungarian statistician Elek Fényes, in 1840 the Croatian Military Frontier was populated by 498,947 people and the ethnic structure was:
 258,454 Croats
 240,493 Serbs

The first modern census from 1857 recorded the religion of the populace of Croatian Military Frontier:
 285,344 Roman Catholics
 253,429 Orthodox Christians
 5,433 Eastern Catholics

74.8% of the active population in Croatian-Slavonian Military Frontier were employed in agriculture, 18.63% were inactive soldiers, while 3.11% were working in industry.

See also
 Slavonian Military Frontier
 Banat Military Frontier
 Kingdom of Croatia (Habsburg)
 Kingdom of Croatia-Slavonia
 Hundred Years' Croatian–Ottoman War

References

Further reading

 

Croatia under Habsburg rule
Military history of Croatia
Military Frontier
1553 establishments in the Habsburg monarchy
1881 disestablishments in Austria-Hungary
16th century military history of Croatia
17th-century military history of Croatia
18th-century military history of Croatia
Frontier
Disestablishments in the Kingdom of Hungary (1867–1918)